Paos (before 1927: Σκούπι - Skoupi) is a village and a community in Achaea, Greece. It was the seat of the municipality of Paion. In 2011 its population was 253 for the village and 298 for the community, which includes the villages Dechounaiika (pop. 18), Palaios Paos (pop. 0), Potamia (pop. 17) and Vesini (pop. 10). It is 25 km southwest of Kalavryta, and 50 km northwest of Tripoli. The Greek National Road 33 (Patras - Tripoli) passes through the village. Its central road is named "111".

Population

History
The location of the ancient city Paos has been found near the modern village, of which the remainder remains to be excavated. Ancient artifacts and remains of the walls have been found. It had a perimeter of 516 m, and had an almost triangular shape with its point facing west with its acropolis in the middle and some ancient buildings to the south, its springs used to be to the northeast with an aqueduct north of the old city. It was said that Euphorion from Paos gave lodging to the Dioscuri, and ever since kept open house for all men. Paos in later years annexed with the neighboring Kleitor. Pausanias wrote that Paos was a ruined settlement near the city of Seirai.

Gallery

See also
List of settlements in Achaea

References

External links
Paos at the GTP Travel Pages

Archaeological sites in the Peloponnese (region)
Populated places in Achaea